Butyriboletus is a genus of fungi in the family Boletaceae. The genus was circumscribed in 2014 by mycologists David Arora and Jonathan L. Frank to accommodate "butter bolete" species that were shown by molecular analysis to be phylogenetically distinct from Boletus. Butyriboletus contains 21 ectomycorrhizal species found in Asia, Europe, North America and north Africa.

The group had earlier been classified as the section Appendiculati within the large genus Boletus. They were given the common name "butter boletes" as the color of their stalk, flesh and pores was similar to that of butter.  Genetic analysis published in 2013 shows that these species are part of a regius clade (named for B. regius), distinct from the core group of the type species B. edulis and relatives within the Boletineae. The narrowing of Boletus to this latter group meant that this group would need to be placed in a separate genus, with Boletus appendiculatus (now Butyriboletus appendiculatus) designated as the type species. The genus name itself is derived from the Latin butyrum "butter".

The butter boletes have red or brown caps, yellow pores and stipes that turn blue when cut or bruised in many species, and olive-brown spindle-shaped spores. Their flesh is usually mild tasting. Butyriboletus roseoflavus is a highly regarded edible mushroom sold in markets in southwestern and southeastern China, while two other species—B. yicibus and B. sanicibus—are eaten to a lesser degree in Yunnan Province.

Species

The following species are recognized, though more may yet be described from Japan, Mexico and China.

Butyriboletus abieticola
Butyriboletus appendiculatus
Butyriboletus autumniregius
Butyriboletus brunneus
Butyriboletus cepaeodoratus
Butyriboletus fechtneri
Butyriboletus floridanus
Butyriboletus frostii
Butyriboletus fuscoroseus
Butyriboletus huangnianlaii
Butyriboletus peckii
Butyriboletus persolidus
Butyriboletus primiregius
Butyriboletus pulchriceps
Butyriboletus querciregius
Butyriboletus regius
Butyriboletus roseoflavus
Butyriboletus roseogriseus
Butyriboletus roseopurpureus
Butyriboletus sanicibus
Butyriboletus subappendiculatus
Butyriboletus ventricosus
Butyriboletus yicibus

References

External links

 
Boletales genera